Pat Fitzgerald is an American college football coach

Pat Fitzgerald may also refer to:
Pat Fitzgerald (footballer, born 1874) (1874–1903), Australian footballer for Collingwood
Pat Fitzgerald (footballer, born 1936), Australian footballer for Footscray
Pat Fitzgerald (hurler) (1881–1970), Irish hurler

See also
Patrick Fitzgerald (disambiguation)